The 2015 World Artistic Gymnastics Championships was the forty-sixth edition of the Artistic Gymnastics World Championships. The competition was held from 23 October – 1 November 2015 at The SSE Hydro in Glasgow, United Kingdom, and is the first time that Scotland hosted the event. The competition served as a qualification for the 2016 Summer Olympics.

Japan won the men's team all-around competition for the first time since 1978, and the United States won the women's team all-around title for the third straight time. In the individual all-around competitions, Kōhei Uchimura and Simone Biles won their sixth and third successive title, respectively. Qualifying in thirteenth place, team Romania failed to automatically qualify to the Olympic Games for the first time since 1966.

On December 4, 2015, British Gymnastics announced that the event had been named "Sporting Event of the Year" by The Sunday Mail.

Competition schedule
All times are BST (UTC+1) from 23 to 24 October 2015 and GMT (UTC±0) from 25 October to 1 November 2015.

Venue 
The competition was held in The SSE Hydro, which opened in 2013. This arena hosted the Gymnastics events at the 2014 Commonwealth Games.

Olympic qualification 

As is traditional for any World Championships prior to the Olympic year, the Championships served as the first of two qualification rounds for artistic gymnasts to the 2016 Olympics in Rio de Janeiro, Brazil. In the qualification round of Worlds, the top 8 teams in both MAG and WAG competitions received an automatic qualification berth to the Games. Teams placed 9–16th at the World Championships were invited to the 2016 Olympic Test Event in Rio and the top 4 teams from that event made up the 12 teams at the Olympics.

Medalists
Names with an asterisk (*) denote the team alternate.

Medal table
The United States led the medal table for second consecutive time, followed by Japan and Russia, while host Great Britain finished 5th with 5 medals.

Medal standings

Overall

Men

Women

Men's results

Team competition 

Oldest and youngest competitors

Individual all-around 

Oldest and youngest competitors

Floor 

Oldest and youngest competitors

Pommel horse 

Oldest and youngest competitors

Rings 

Oldest and youngest competitors

Vault 

Oldest and youngest competitors

Parallel bars 

Oldest and youngest competitors

Horizontal bar 

Oldest and youngest competitors

Manrique Larduet was qualified for the Olympics, as an individual, by medaling on this event.

Women's results

Team competition 

Oldest and youngest competitors

Individual all-around 

Oldest and youngest competitors

Vault 
Medaling on the event allowed North Korea's Hong Un-jong to qualify to the Olympics as an individual.

Oldest and youngest competitors

Uneven bars 
This was the first four-way tie in history for gold at a World Artistic Gymnastics Championships, but this is unlikely to happen again because the World Championships has instituted a tie-breaking procedure since then similar to the Olympics to prevent a situation like this from happening again.

Oldest and youngest competitors

Balance beam 
Simone Biles of the USA defended her beam title from 2014, becoming the first back-to-back world champion on beam. With her ninth career world championships gold medal, she tied the record held by Larisa Latynina, Gina Gogean, and Svetlana Khorkina. Sanne Wevers of the Netherlands and Pauline Schäfer of Germany won the first medals for their countries on the balance beam. Schäfer also qualified as an individual to the Olympics by medaling (she had not directly qualified as Germany failed to make the team final, but made the Test Event).

Oldest and youngest competitors

Floor 
Due to an elbow injury prior to the final, Erika Fasana withdrew from the final, being replaced by Shang Chunsong. Additionally, Swiss gymnast Giulia Steingruber sustained a knee injury during the vault final the day before, rendering her unable to participate in the floor final. She was replaced by Lieke Wevers of the Netherlands. Simone Biles won a record 10th career world championships gold medal.

Oldest and youngest competitors

References

External links 

 

 
2015
World Artistic Gymnastics Championships
World Artistic Gymnastics Championships
World Artistic Gymnastics Championships
World Artistic Gymnastics Championships
International sports competitions in Glasgow
International gymnastics competitions hosted by the United Kingdom
2010s in Glasgow